The 2008 Icelandic truck driver protests were protests started by truck drivers in Iceland through March−April 2008. The protest came about due to increasing oil prices and working hours.

Background 
In 2008, due to the 2008 Icelandic financial crisis, Icelandic oil prices were increasing rapidly, with one Icelandic reporting that fuel for his 4x4 truck cost as much as 12,000 kronas ($161). 

Truck drivers began protesting against these prices, also aiming for lower tariffs on fossil fuels.

Violence 
Violence against protesters is very rare in Iceland.

According to a person’s iReport footage, somebody from behind the police barricade sprayed a can of fluid into the crowd, possibly CS gas, as one protester is seen rubbing their eyes a few seconds later.

Aftermath 
Prime Minister Geir H. Haarde told the Fréttablaðið newspaper, “I am very sorry this happened. It is not in consistency with Icelandic traditions to solve disputes with violence, but I believe it is necessary that police use the resources they have to protect public safety.”

References

Lorry driver protests
Protests in Iceland
Riots and civil disorder in Iceland
Icelandic lorry driver
Fuel protests